James Evander Munro Yuill (born 13 February 1956) is a Scottish actor.

He is a member of the Royal Shakespeare Company and later joined the Renaissance Theatre Company.  He has appeared in many of Kenneth Branagh's films, most recently as Edward Woolmer in the 2018 film All Is True. Yuill was also the music composer for A Midwinter's Tale and Swan Song.

He is best known for the character Detective Inspector Doug Kersey in the popular British television series Wycliffe. He was in every episode except the last two in Season 5. The series was cancelled after that because Jack Shepherd refused to continue in the title role when the producers had sacked Yuill "for insurance reasons" after he contracted life-threatening meningitis during filming, and then would not reinstate him even though he made a full recovery.

In June 2006, Yuill made his first appearance in EastEnders as the recurring character Victor Brown. In October 2007, he took the lead in Sophocles' Antigone as Creon, King of Thebes at The Tron Theatre, Glasgow.

In 2010, he was nominated for the award of Best Male Performance for his role in a play adaption of the Testament of Cresseid by the Critics Award for Theatre in Scotland.

Yuill has worked as a performance consultant on a number of productions, and also as a producer.

Selected roles 

The Mackinnons (1977, TV series) as Tom Stewart
A Sense of Freedom (1977, film) as Dunkie
Death Watch (1978, film)
Square Mile of Murder (1980, TV series)
Play for Today: The Good Time Girls (1981, TV play) as Finlayson
Andrina (1981, TV play) as Stanley
Mindrape (1982, play at the Sheffield Crucible and Greenwich Theatres)
People V Scott (1982, TV movie) as Kevin Gourlay
The World Cup: A Captain's Tale (1982, TV movie) (uncredited)
Objects of Affection (1982, TV series) as Charles
Local Hero (1983, film) as Iain, the man who asks Mac for his autograph near the end of the film
Boon (1987–1992, TV series) as Eric
Eurocops (1988, TV series) as McCulloch
Henry V (1989, film) as Jamy
Paper Mask (1990, film) as Alec Moran
Much Ado About Nothing (1993, film) as the Friar
Grushko (1994, TV series) as Chazov
Alleyn Mysteries (1994–1995, TV series) as Angus Findlay
Frankenstein (1994, film)
Hamish Macbeth (1994, TV series) as Lachlan McRae (Series 1)
A Mugs Game (1995, TV series) as Alan
Wycliffe (1994–1998, TV series) as DI Doug Kersey
Casualty (1998, TV series) as Donald Mallett
Psychos (1999, TV miniseries)
Monsignor Renard (2000, TV series) as Malo Gagnepain
Strictly Sinatra (2000, film)
Brotherly Love (2000, TV series) as Callum
Schneider's 2nd Stage (2001, film short) as Detective Chief Inspector
A Touch of Frost (2003, TV) as Charles Lightfoot in "Close Encounters"
Murphy's Law (2004, TV series) as Miller Davidson, arms smuggler
Ladies in Lavender (2004, film) as Constable Timmins
The Inspector Lynley Mysteries (2005, TV series) as PC Garrett in In Divine Proportion
Dalziel and Pascoe (2006, TV series) as Robert MacAlpine in "Guardian Angel"
As You Like It (2006, film) as Corin
EastEnders (2006–present, TV series) as Victor Brown
Antigone (2007, play) as Creon, King of Thebes
The Bill (2007–2009, TV series) as Martin Turnbull
Holby City (2008–2022, TV series) as Kenneth McGivering
Taggart (2009–2011, TV series) as DCI Wilson
Princess Kaiulani (2010, film) as Archie Cleghorn
Terry Pratchett's Going Postal (2010, miniseries) as Mr. Spools
New Tricks (2010, TV series) as George Milligan in "The Fourth Man"
Retreat (2011, film)
The Raven (2012, film) as Captain Eldridge
Macbeth (2013, National Theatre Live production with Kenneth Branagh) as Banquo
All Is True (2018, film) as Edward Woolmer

References

External links 

1956 births
Living people
People educated at Golspie High School
Scottish male soap opera actors
Scottish male stage actors
People from Golspie